Doherty is an Irish surname. It is anglicized of the Gaelic Ó Dochartaigh.

List of people surnamed Doherty 
 Alejandro Doherty (born 1965), Argentinian field hockey player
 Alice Elizabeth Doherty, (1887–1933), known for her rare condition of hypertrichosis lanuginosa
 Amina Doherty, Nigerian women's rights advocate
 Anne Doherty (1928–2013), American educator, professor and psychologist
 Arthur Doherty (1932–2003), Irish nationalist politician
 Barbara Doherty (1931–2020), educator and theologian
 Beth Doherty, Irish climate activist
 Berlie Doherty (born 1943), English novelist, poet, playwright and screenwriter
 Bernard Doherty (born 1949), English music executive 
 Brendan Doherty (born 1959), American police officer and politician 
 Brian Doherty (disambiguation), several people 
 Carl Doherty (born 1975), New Zealand professional rugby league player
 Catherine Doherty (1896–1985), Russian-Canadian social activist
 Catherine Doherty (camogie) (born 1981), Irish camogie player
 Charla Doherty (1946–1988), American actress
 Charles Doherty (1855–1931), Canadian politician and jurist
 Charles Wiley Doherty (1855-?), American politician
 Charlie Doherty (1876–1961), Australian rules footballer
 Chris Doherty (born 1965), American musician
 Christopher Doherty (born 1958), American politician
 Claire Doherty, British gallery director
 Colette Doherty, Irish poker player
 Con Doherty (1884–1967), Australian rules footballer
 Conor Doherty (born 1990), Irish Gaelic footballer
 Darrien Doherty (born 1971), Australian former rugby league footballer
 David Doherty (disambiguation), several people
 Denis Doherty (1861–1935), Australian businessman and politician
 Denny Doherty (1940–2007), Canadian singer
 Diana Doherty, Australian oboist
 Diona Doherty, (born 1989), Northern Irish Comedian and actress
 Dick Doherty, Irish hurler in the 1910s
 Eamon Doherty (born 1974), Irish League footballer
 Eamonn Doherty, Irish Gaelic footballer
 Earl Doherty (born 1941), Canadian author
 Edward Doherty (disambiguation), several people
 Erin Doherty, British actor
 Eugene Doherty (1862–1937), Irish politician
 Fergal Doherty (born 1981), Irish Gaelic footballer
 Fraser Doherty, Scottish entrepreneur
 Fred Doherty (1887–1961), Canadian professional ice hockey player
 Gary Doherty (born 1980), retired Irish professional footballer
 Ged Doherty (born 1958), British music industry executive
 George Doherty (1920–1987), American football player
 Gerard Doherty (born 1981), Irish footballer
 Gerard F. Doherty (born 1928), American politician 
 Henry Latham Doherty (1870–1939), Irish-American financier and oilman
 Hugh Doherty (disambiguation), several people
 Ivy Duffy Doherty (1922–2008), Australian-American writer
 Jack Doherty (footballer, born 1915) (1915–1990), Australian rules footballer
 Jack Doherty (footballer, born 1921) (1921–1998), Australian rules footballer 
 Jack Doherty (potter) (born 1948), Northern Irish studio potter and author
 James Doherty (disambiguation), several people
 Jason Doherty (born 1989), Irish Gaelic footballer 
 Jimmy Doherty (farmer) (born 1975), English farmer and television presenter
 Jock Doherty (1894–1957), Australian rules footballer
 Joe Doherty (born 1955), member of the Provisional Irish Republican Army
 Joe Doherty (singer) (born 1970), American punk-rock musician
 John Doherty (disambiguation), several people
 Josh Doherty (born 1996), British footballer
 Katherine Doherty, American actress
 Kathleen A. Doherty, American diplomat
 Katie Doherty (born 1983), English singer-songwriter
 Ken Doherty (born 1969), Irish professional snooker player
 Ken Doherty (track and field) (1905–1996), American decathlon champion
 Kevin Doherty (disambiguation), several people 
 Kieran Doherty (hunger striker) (1955–1981), Irish republican hunger striker
 Kieran Doherty (writer), Irish writer and TV format creator
 Lani Doherty (born 1993), American surfer
 Larry Joe Doherty (born 1946), American attorney, judge, and TV show host
 Laurence Doherty (1875–1919), British tennis player
 Lee Doherty (born 1979), English retired professional footballer
 Len Doherty (1930–1983), British miner, journalist and writer
 Manning Doherty (1875–1938), Canadian farmer, businessman and politician
 Margaret Doherty (born 1951), American politician 
 Martin Doherty (born 1982), Scottish musician and producer
 Martin Doherty (Irish republican) (1958–1994), member of Provisional Irish Republican Army
 Matt Doherty (disambiguation), several people
 Matthew Doherty (disambiguation), several people
 Mel Doherty (1894–1942), American professional football player and coach
 Melissa Doherty (born 1967), Canadian visual artist
 Michael Doherty (disambiguation), several people
 Michelle Doherty, Irish actress and model
 Moya Doherty (born 1957), Irish producer and co-founder of Riverdance
 Neil Doherty (disambiguation), several people 
 Noel Doherty (loyalist) (1940–2008), Northern Irish loyalist activist
 Noel Doherty (footballer) (1921–2011), Australian rules footballer
 Olivia Doherty (born 1982), Australian team handball player
 Paddy Doherty (activist) (1926–2016), Northern Irish activist
 Paddy Doherty (Gaelic footballer) (born 1934), Gaelic footballer
 Paddy Doherty (TV personality) (born 1959), Irish Traveller and bare-knuckle boxer
 Pat Doherty (boxer) (born 1962), English boxer 
 Pat Doherty (politician) (born 1945), Irish politician
 Patrick J. Doherty, United States Air Force general
 Paul Doherty (Gaelic footballer), Irish inter-county goalkeeper for Galway
 Paul C. Doherty (born 1946), English author and educator
 Pearse Doherty (born 1977), Irish politician 
 Pete Doherty (disambiguation), several people
 Peter Doherty (disambiguation), several people
 Peter Charles Doherty, Nobel Prize winner
 Phil Doherty (born 1951), Australian rules footballer
 Raymond Doherty, Lord Doherty (born 1958), Scottish lawyer and judge
 Rebecca F. Doherty (born 1952), United States federal judge
 Regina Doherty, Irish politician 
 Reginald Doherty (1872–1910), British tennis player
 Richard Doherty (born 1948), British military historian and author
 Richard Doherty (colonialist) (1785–1862), British officer and governor of Sierra Leone
 Robert Doherty (disambiguation), several people
 Ryan Doherty (born 1984), American professional beach volleyball player
 Sarah Doherty (born 1959), American amputee mountaineer, ski racer and motivational speaker
 Seán Doherty (disambiguation), several people
 Shannen Doherty (born 1971), American actress and producer
 T. A. Doherty (1895–?), Nigerian businessman and politician
 Taylor Doherty (born 1991), Canadian professional ice hockey player
 Timothy Doherty (born 1950), American Roman Catholic bishop
 Todd Doherty, Canadian politician
 Thomas Doherty (disambiguation), several people 
 Vin Doherty (1911–1982), Australian rules footballer
 William Doherty (disambiguation), several people
 Wiremu Doherty, New Zealand Māori educator and academic
 Xavier Doherty (born 1982), Australian cricketer

Fiction
  Colm Doherty, fictional character in the 2022 film The Banshees of Inisherin
 Brooke Doherty, fictional police officer in the American TV series Third Watch
 Jimmy Doherty (Third Watch character), fictional firefighter in the American TV series
 John (Thunderbolt) Doherty, fictional character in the 1974 film Thunderbolt and Lightfoot

See also
 O'Doherty family
 O'Doherty (surname)
 George Doherty Johnston (1832–1910), Confederate officer during the American Civil War
 John Doherty Barbour (1824–1901), Irish industrialist and politician

Anglicised Irish-language surnames